The 1912 Ohio Green and White football team represented Ohio University as an independent during the 1912 college football season. Led by second-year head coach Arthur Hinaman, the Green and White compiled a record of 1–7–1.

Schedule

References

Ohio
Ohio Bobcats football seasons
Ohio Green and White football